Sun Longjiang (born August 23, 1992 in Jilin) is a Chinese male speed skater.

He competed for China at the 2010 Winter Olympics in the 1000m and 1500m events.

References

1992 births
Living people
Chinese male speed skaters
Olympic speed skaters of China
Sportspeople from Jilin
Speed skaters at the 2010 Winter Olympics
Speed skaters at the 2011 Asian Winter Games
21st-century Chinese people